Costilla may refer to:
Costilla County, Colorado
Costilla, New Mexico, a census-designated place in Taos County
Costilla Creek, in Colorado and New Mexico
Fernando Costilla (born 1972), Spanish television personality and voice actor